Utpal Malik is an Indian politician from Bharatiya Janata Party. In President of Deshra BJP West Bengal from Katulpur (constituency).

References 

Living people
Year of birth missing (living people)
21st-century Indian politicians
People from Bankura district
Bharatiya Janata Party politicians from West Bengal
West Bengal MLAs 2021–2026